Nomorhamphus megarrhamphus is a species of viviparous halfbeak, a freshwater fish endemic to Lake Towuti in Sulawesi, Indonesia.

Nomorhamphus megarrhamphus has a pelagic life style. It grows up to 12 cm length. It has been called the Indonesian halfbeak.

References

megarrhamphus
Freshwater fish of Indonesia
Fish described in 1982
Taxonomy articles created by Polbot